Alfred Thomas Hobson (1880-1957) was an English professional football centre forward and inside right who played in the Football League for West Bromwich Albion.

Personal life 
After retiring from football, Hobson joined the Metropolitan Police Service on 17 January 1910, warrant number 97844. He retired from the service on 1 April 1934.

Career statistics

References

1880 births
English footballers
Sportspeople from Tipton
Brentford F.C. players
English Football League players
Association football inside forwards
1957 deaths
Wednesbury Old Athletic F.C. players
West Bromwich Albion F.C. players
Crewe Alexandra F.C. players
Gainsborough Trinity F.C. players
Southern Football League players
Darlington F.C. players
Northern Football League players